The battle of Quechereguas occurred on 8 April 1814, during the War of Chilean Independence.

Background

The Royalists had taken the key Patriot town of Talca in March, 1814, and an army, under the command of Gabino Gaínza, now threatened to advance on the Patriot capital of Santiago itself. Bernardo O' Higgins, the famous Patriot leader, attempted to intervene to prevent this.

The battle

Gabino Gaínza had crossed over the Maule river with his forces, advancing northwards. O' Higgins was unable to pursue him during the day, because of the size of the Royalist force. During the night, however, O' Higgins secretly made the crossing, marched rapidly to the north and placed himself at the site of Quechereguas, in between the Royalist force and the road to Santiago. Gabino Gaínza responded by attacking the next day; O' Higgins' men firmly repulsed the attack, forcing the Royalists to fall back on Talca once more.

See also
 1814 in Chile
 History of Chile
  

Conflicts in 1814
Battles involving Chile
Battles involving Spain
Battles of the Spanish American wars of independence
Battles of the Chilean War of Independence
Battles of the Patria Vieja Campaign
History of Maule Region
1814 in the Captaincy General of Chile
1814 in the Spanish Empire
April 1814 events